Zulia State (Wayuu: Mma’ipakat Suuria) is one of the 23 states of Venezuela. The state capital is Maracaibo. As of the 2011 census, it has a population of 3,704,404, the largest population among Venezuela's states. It is also one of the few states (if not the only one) in Venezuela in which voseo (the use of vos as a second person singular pronoun) is widespread. The state is coterminous with the eponymous region of Zulia.

Zulia State is in northwestern Venezuela, bordering Lake Maracaibo, the largest body of water of its kind in Latin America. Its basin covers one of the largest oil and gas reserves in the Western Hemisphere.

Zulia is economically important to the country for its oil and mineral exploitation, but it is also one of the major agricultural areas of Venezuela, highlighting the region's contribution in areas such as livestock, bananas, fruits, meat, and milk.

Toponymy

There are several competing theories about the origin of the state's name. One is that Guaimaral, son of the cacique Mara, was on pilgrimage in the Pamplona region, where he fell in love with the beautiful Zulia, but she was killed in a battle against the conquerors. Gaimaral sadly returned to his father's domains, naming rivers, towns and regions for his lost love there is little historical proof, but that is the most popular theory.

History

Spanish Colonization 
The area that is now Zulia was first seen by Europeans in 1499 during an expedition commanded by Alonso de Ojeda. Transferred by the Crown of Spain to German Businessmen (to the banking company of the Welsers of Augsburg), in 1527, the Governorship and lands of the Province of Venezuela, was its factor and governor of: the Province Ambrosio Dalfinger, the first conqueror of those regions.

His expedition from Coro to Maracaibo around 1528 and 1529 and the one he carried out at the end of 1529 along the eastern shore of the lake up to the mouth of the Motatán river, were the first occasions, after the discovery, in which they made contact
the Europeans with the Indians living in Lake Maracaibo. These risky enterprises, for which a great deal of value and energy was required, were interesting subjects that inspired the chronicler Juan de Castellanos much of his poetic work concluded by the year
of 1590 under the title of "Elegies of Illustrious Men of the Indies.

During the Spanish colonial period, its lands were part of the Venezuela Province until 1676, when its lands were added to the Province of Mérida del Espiritu Santo de la Grita, becoming the province Espiritu Santo de Maracaibo, or Maracaibo Province.

The territory that covers the State of Zulia was erected in the Province of Maracaibo in the year of 1678 and was added, along with Mérida, to the Viceroyalty of the New Kingdom of Granada. It is entity was governed by the President of the Court, whose official seat was the city of Santa Fé de Bogotá and its jurisdiction extended, in a capricious and extravagant way, to the Provinces of Guayana, Cumaná, Maracaibo and the Islands of Margarita and Trinidad The difficulties that to its good administration offered this curious conglomerate, forced
the Court of Madrid to modify the primitive division and by Royal Decree of September 8, 1777, the Provinces of Maracaibo, Cumaná, Guayana and the Islands of Margarita and Trinidad were incorporated into the General Captaincy of Caracas.

By Royal Decree of February 15, 1785, the city of Barinas and its dependencies, which corresponded to Maracaibo, were segregated to form a separate province, and instead the city of Trujillo was incorporated, which was part of the province of Caracas. In 1789, the province covered the territory of the current Venezuelan states of Zulia, Apure, Barinas, Táchira, Mérida and Trujillo. In 1810, Mérida and Trujillo were separated as new provinces. At the beginning of the 19th century, the province of Maracaibo had, besides the capital of its name, the cities of Mérida, Trujillo, San Cristobal, El Rosario de Perijá and San Bartolomé de Sinamaica, with their respective dependencies; but once the independence of Mérida, was segregated with the character of a province, while Maracaibo continued under the Spanish regime until January 18, 1821, on which date it joined the Great Colombia, proclaiming its independence from the Government of Madrid.

Republican period 

Zulia Province declared independence from Spain on January 28, 1821. During the Gran Colombia period in 1824, it received the name of "Zulia Department", honoring the Zulia River. The Constituent Congress of 1824 divided the territory of Colombia into four departments, one of which was Zulia, composed of the provinces of Coro, Mérida and Maracaibo; but when the Great Colombia was dissolved in 1830, Maracaibo was left with the character of Province composed of its own territory and that of Trujillo. One year later the Trujillo Section was erected in Province, separating definitively from Maracaibo. With the dissolution of Gran Colombia in 1830, it was named Maracaibo Province and was one of the 11 provinces of Venezuela. In 1835 the territory of the Province of Maracaibo was divided into the five Cantons: Maracaibo, Perijá, Zulia, Gibraltar and Altagracia. By Decree of April 9, 1850 were added. the territory of the Province of Trujillo the parishes of La Ceiba and La Ceibita, belonging to Maracaibo, so that that Andean Province had an exit to the Lake.

Venezuela's federal constitution, April 22, 1864, changed the denomination of "province" to "state", creating the State of Maracaibo on the same territory as the province. At the end of the same year, the state's legislation determined to change the name to the Sovereign State of Zulia, but that lasted only a few months. In 1874, its name again became Zulia State. Federal government orders in 1881 created the combined Falcón Zulia state. Its autonomous state status continued until April 1, 1890, when congress legislated the separation of the Falcon-Zulia State. It suffered further territorial changes towards the end of the 19th century, until the current delimitation in 1899 was finally drawn. Since that time the name has remained Estado Zulia.

Geography

The state of Zulia is a compendium of diverse geographical areas. Plains, mountains, a large lake to which about 135 rivers flow that contribute water and sediment, an infinite number of lagoons, swamps and marshes that are in the lower parts. There are very arid zones with others of great humidity, very populated zones in small spaces and other extensive semi-populated areas. Very rich areas and others of great poverty.
 
The Lake Maracaibo Basin covers the large to the north and west, from the Guajira Peninsula to the Perijá Mountains. Venezuela's Andean states of Táchira, Mérida and Trujillo border Zulia State at the southern end of Lake Maracaibo.

The name Venezuela comes from the lake. When Spanish conquistadors sailed into the area, they found the indigenous peoples living in communities of huts supported by stilts along the shores of the lake. They were reminded of Venice and named the place "Little Venice" or Venezuela. The lake has a number of islands, some of which are populated.

Near the mouth of the Catatumbo River, where it empties into Lake Maracaibo, is the famous Catatumbo lightning (Relámpago del Catatumbo) which is represented on the state's flag and coat of arms by lightning bolts.

Due to its geographical location, Zulia has geostrategic and geopolitical advantages combined in the diversity of resources given by the nature of its geography, geology and hydrography, drawing in its territory a heterogeneous mosaic of potentialities for the economic, social and cultural development, manifested in the practice of agriculture, livestock, forestry, mining, fishing and tourism, with areas under special administration. These elements make Zulia a federal entity capable of contributing within the economic activities, a complex industrial marked by its uniqueness, reinforced by the routes and means of lake-marine communications that facilitate the entry and exit of products and goods to the international market. Consequently, it is a nodal center of development in the western geography of Venezuela that manages and concentrates its internal flows and placed at any point of the planet by its expeditious air, land, sea and lake routes.

The state of Zulia, from the geomorphological point of view, can be defined as a depression that presents in its center a great mass of water constituted by the Maracaibo lake system, combining the heights that surround it and the flat lands that serve as coastal support. The geomorphological evolution of the state of Zulia is related to the processes generated by the collision between the South American and Pacific tectonic plates, in their interaction with the Caribbean plate. Throughout its geological history, the Andes and Perijá became positive zones; however, an orogenic pulsation in the Upper Eocene and another one during the Miocene-Pliocene defined the current form of these mountainous systems, conditioning the depression of the Maracaibo and its surrounding plains.

These orogenic processes made the Perijá mountain range suffer a less intense uplift than the Andes and, therefore, its structural pattern and relief are more moderate. Likewise, the Ziruma mountain range develops towards the southeast, considered as a pre-mountain range system of relatively lower altitudes, where only tertiary rocks emerge.
.
According to the most recent classification, the state of Zulia presents three basic physical-natural units: the natural region of the Perijá mountain range; the natural region of the Corian sierras and the natural region formed by the depression of the Maracaibo lake and the coastal plains of the gulf of Venezuela.

The Perijá mountain range 

The natural region Cordillera de Perijá or western Andean mountain range is located in the west of Zulia state. This unit occupies an area of 4,170.55 km2, which represents 12.92% of the state. Part of the most western sectors of the Machiques de Perijá, Rosario de Perijá, Jesús Enrique Lossada, Mara and Guajira municipalities are located in this natural region.
The Perijá mountain range can be considered a horst tectonic that starts in the valley of the Intermedio river, lengthening and narrowing in a south–north direction ending in the Oca mountains, from which the lowlands of the Guajira isthmus follow.
The Perijá mountain range comprises five large landscape units:
Sierra de Motilones, Sierra de Perijá, Sierra de Valledupar, Montes de Oca and the foothills of mountains and valleys.

Valleys 

Between the Perijá mountain range and the Maracaibo lake there is a wide plain, very flat, which due to its topographic differences, drainage, edaphic and vegetal formations can be differentiated in two areas: a northwest area of less flat topography, with presence of hills in some sectors, scarce hydrographic network, sandy soils and low in organic matter.

Between the southern area of the Palmar River and the northern area of the Catatumbo River, the lands are very flat and low, particularly those closest to Lake Maracaibo are flooded during rainy periods or when there is an overflow of rivers, giving rise to alluvial sandy-clay soils.

The Maracaibo Lake Depression 
This natural region includes the 21 municipalities that make up the state of Zulia and occupies an area of 24,377.81 km2, representing 75.51% of the state. In the center of the depression is the engraved tectonic pit occupied by the water masses of the Maracaibo Lake system, "where more than 10,000 m3 of sediments have been accumulated, whose ages are from the Cretaceous (Mesozoic) to the Recent (Cenozoic). 
These deposits of both marine and terrestrial origin contain an important accumulation of hydrocarbons that make it one of the richest oil basins in South America.

The tectonic fossa is a product of the orogenesis directly related to the uplifts of the Perijá and Andean mountain ranges that occurred during the Tertiary period (late Eocene and Oligo-Miocene), and the Falcón mountain ranges (Oligo-Miocene). This pit occupies about 12,870 km2 of surface.

Alluvial plains 
This type of landscape is formed by the deposition of sediments from the rivers of the western and eastern margins of the state of Zulia, specifically in the lower courses of the rivers Limón, Guasare, Cachirí and Socuy (municipalities Mara and Jesús Enrique Lossada); the rivers Palmar, San Juan and Apón (municipalities Rosario de Perijá, Machiques de Perijá and La Cañada de Urdaneta); in the western alluvial plains, while in the eastern alluvial plains (municipalities of Miranda, Cabimas, Santa Rita and Lagunillas) they are the result of the deposition of sediments from the rivers Araure, Mene, Ulé, Tamare, Pueblo Viejo, Machango and Misoa.  This landscape corresponds to flat lands, of recent origin and scarce height, which varies between 50 and 100 meters above sea level.

Swamps of the south of the lake of Maracaibo 
The swampy landscape of Zulia State corresponds to the southern lands of Lake Maracaibo. They occupy an area of 1,766.53 km2, which represents 5% of the state. In this plain, the Santa Ana River system converges, formed on its left bank by the Lora and Aricuaisá Rivers, and by the Tucuco and Río Negro Rivers, in their lower course, forming highly floodable lands, generating river arms, lagoons, lakes, among which the protected area known as Ciénagas de Juan Manuel National Park stands out.

To the southeast of the Santa Ana, towards the southern area of the lake, the Catatumbo river system, to which the Socuavó, Tarra and Zulia rivers drain, also provides significant volumes of water and sediments to the marshes.
Towards the southeast of the lake, in the sector located between the Pocó and Escalante rivers, there is close contact with the northwestern Andean slope, and there is a reduced relief of excrement cones, terraces and torrential lava flows that sometimes manifest themselves in low, rounded hills.

Climate
In the northern sector a semi-arid climate prevails, with an irregular pluviometric regime. The precipitation rates increase in the western and eastern regions of Lake Maracaibo, forming a wet tropical savanna climate, with annual average temperatures from 27 °C to 28 °C, and rainfall exceeding  registered in Mene Grande. In the southern lake region, increased rainfall conforms to a tropical rain forest climate with an annual average precipitation of 2,556 mm, and surpassing 3,500 mm per year in the heights of Serrania de Perija.

The geographical location and the diversity of natural landscapes present in the state of Zulia, in addition to the presence of Lake Maracaibo, define the great variety of climates present in the state. According to Koeppen's classification, there are desert climates (Bwhi), semi-dry tropical climates (Bshi), tropical savannah and sub-humid trophy forests (Awi), tropical rainy trophy forests and savannah (Aw "i), tropical rainy monsoon (Ami), tropical rainy jungle (Afi), very humid tropical temperate (Cfi), tropical humid temperate (Cwi) and undefined mountain climates.

Lake Maracaibo and its basin are factors that complement each other to produce high rainfall. However, for the specific case of the northern part of the state, the wind added to the flat relief causes dry climates, with values that vary between 200 mm and 600 mm of average annual precipitation, and a higher average annual evaporation than the precipitation, such as that which occurs in Maracaibo for the period 1993-2003 of 2,339 mm.

The distribution of precipitation in the state of Zulia is influenced by latitude, which generates an increase from north to south in the average annual precipitation of the Maracaibo (488 mm), Cabimas (528.9 mm) and Santa Barbara (1,366.5 mm) stations. This behavior is explained by the descending latitudinal order, at except for the El Tucuco station (2,032.9 mm), whose behavior is due to the altitudinal factor (205 meters above sea level), where the orography favors high rainfall.

Hydrography 

The geomorphological conformation of the state of Zulia is a semicircular depression. It defines a hydrographic pattern that can be catalogued by its shape as a radial drainage, that is, that the waters coming from the water dividers are directed towards a
common outlet, Lake Maracaibo, which defines this characteristic pattern.

The Zulia hydrographic network is made up of numerous river basins and sub-basins that cover the states of Zulia, Lara, Táchira, Mérida, Trujillo and part of the Republic of Colombia, the latter drained by the Catatumbo River and its tributaries. All of them flow into the area comprised by the lake itself, the Maracaibo Strait and the El Tablazo Bay. Some sources indicate that the Maracaibo system is made up of four distinct but closely related bodies of water:
the Gulf of Venezuela, El Tablazo Bay, the Maracaibo Strait and Lake Maracaibo. Although the estuarine portion is mainly constituted by the strait and El Tablazo, it is not possible to understand the estuarine biota without taking into account the other adjacent water bodies.

The Gulf of Venezuela participates in the oceanic components, hence the importance of considering the depth, movement and chemical composition of its water body. Such physical-chemical characteristics determine the capacity to absorb and dilute the contaminating elements that may be present in this water body.
The Gulf of Venezuela, with a total surface of 17,840 km2, without including the bay of El Tablazo, is located to the north of the outer portion of the marabinal depression. Its shape is approximately rectangular, with the major axis in the northeast–southwest direction.
The outer limit of the gulf with the waters of the Caribbean Sea, on the north side, is given by a line between Punta Espada and Punta Macolla. The distance between both points is 111.12 km.

The gulf of Venezuela is a body of water that presents the following movements: of sea, of tides, marine currents and investments of water mass, which provides a high capacity to oxygenate itself and to dilute the pollutants and sediments. Scarce fluvial currents flow into this gulf, due to the arid conditions that characterize the continental territory that borders it. The most important hydrological contributions are not located in the sector of the marabine coast, but come from the mountainous system of the state of Falcon.

In the Maracaibo Lake basin, 21 major sub-basins have been identified, some of which go beyond the political-territorial limits of the State of Zulia.  The most important basin is that of the Catatumbo River, with a surface of 25,708.36 km2 and represents more than a quarter (32.60%) of the total area of Maracaibo Lake Basin.

Soils 
The soils of Zulia State, framed within the depression of Lake Maracaibo, are the result of the interaction of factors such as relief, climate, material
origin, vegetation and soil formation processes.

The edaphic diversity of the state of Zulia corresponds to the physiographic and climatic characteristics of the entity, hence to differentiate the types of existing soils the sectorization of the state is used, even though spatially they do not always maintain continuity, but similarity in the existing types of soil.

Vegetation 

The state of Zulia, due to its great territorial extension and the great variability of type of landscapes, climate and soil, allows the existence of a great diversity of landscapes plants which, according to Huber's classification, can be grouped into tree, shrub and herbaceous formations. Tree formations include coastal mangroves, dry to semi-deciduous lowland forests, lowland evergreen forests, and mountain forests.

It is estimated that the total area of mangroves in Zulia State occupies an area of 116.3 km2 (44.9 mi2), located in the Cocinetas, Peonias, Sinamaica and Los Olivitos lagoons, and the mouth of the Limon River. For the coastal wetlands in the entire system of Maracaibo is estimated an area of 5,683 km2 (2,194 mi2), highlighting in the south of the lake the swamps of Juan Manuel de Aguas Claras and Aguas Negras
.
The mangrove vegetation is rather dense. It comprises a set of predominant species, among which are: red mangrove (Rhizophora mangle), black and pink mangrove (Avicennia germinans), white mangrove (Laguncularia racemosa) and the buttonwood mangrove (Conocarpus erectus).

The category of dry semi-deciduous lowland forest occupies the largest area in the state, 18,872.7 km2 (7,286.8 mi2). These plant formations are located above the western coast, in the municipalities Paez, Mara, Maracaibo, Jesus Enrique Lossada, San Francisco, La Cañada de Urdaneta, Rosario de Perijá, Machiques de Perijá, part of Catatumbo and Jesus Maria Semprum.

On the eastern coast they are distributed in the municipalities of Miranda, Santa Rita, Cabimas, Simón Bolívar, Lagunillas and part of the municipality of Valmore Rodriguez. In the municipality of Paez, these plant formations develop in dry climates with an annual average temperature of 28 °C (82.4 °F), average annual rainfall of 125 mm to 250 mm (5 inches to 10 inches) and in Aridisols and Entisols soils. The vegetation varies in size, density and species from the coastal area to the foothills of the Oca mountains.

Fauna 

The fauna is distributed according to the terrestrial or aquatic habitat of fresh and marine water, lentic and lotic waters, and also ecotone fauna.
The dry sub-region includes the municipalities of Paez, Mara, Maracaibo, Miranda, Jesus Enrique Lossada, Cabimas, La Cañada de Urdaneta and Lagunillas. This sub-region is home to vulnerable animal communities, considered to be taxa that face a high risk of extinction in the medium term. Among the different species of mammals, the palm tree bear (Myrmecophaga tridactyla), which lives especially in the northeast of the Lake Maracaibo basin, is threatened by poaching and is often rolled up on the tracks.

The cunaguaro (Leopardus pardalis), often in thorny forests, thickets and even in mangrove forests, this species - a house today - is threatened by distraction hunting; it is also destroying its habitat even though it is a species under an indefinite ban. There are others mammals in this sub-region that are at lower risk than those mentioned above, such as the endemic subspecies brownish-grey matacan deer (Mazama gouazoubira), which is distributed in arid areas and is persecuted as a source of subsistence food for its meat, which is considered to be of high quality. 
The red deer (Odocoileus virginianus gymnotis), subspecies that has contracted by almost 50% in the arid zones of Zulia and in the basin of the Maracaibo lake due to the indiscriminate hunting to which it has been object, given the inexistence of a specific law to protect it. The yellow bat of the deserts (Rhogeessa minutilla) is distributed in the arid and semi-arid zones of the northeast and northwest of the state of Zulia. The decrease in vegetation as a result of livestock activity has generated a destruction of their habitat.

Among the bird species, the little cardinal (Carduelis cucullata) is considered the most threatened not only in Zulia, but in the whole country. The cause of this situation is related to its capture and trade: the beauty of its plumage has been used as an ornament for hats. In less risk (prone to the effects of the activities human) stand out: the flamingo (Phoenicopterus ruber), distributed in the swamp of
Los Olivitos, Miranda municipality, and in the Gran Eneal lagoon, Paez municipality. Although this species cannot be classified as particularly threatened, the loss of its habitats, feeding and nesting areas, together with the lack of adequate management of its shelters, has led to important studies and pro-conservation campaigns, in order to protect and ensure its integrity.

Among the reptiles, the following stand out: the coastal caiman (Crocodylus acutus), whose distribution is severely reduced at present, is located mainly in the Pueblo Viejo dam, municipality of Lagunillas. It is an endangered species, threatened mainly by the commercialization of its skin. In lesser risk is a species of turtle, Morroccoy sabanero (Geochelone carbonaria), which is distributed in dry forest areas, and is illegally extracted. Two species of indigenous reptiles are named after Zulia: a turtle (Mesoclemmys zuliae) and a lizard (Maracaiba zuliae).

In the humid and sub-humid Zulian sub-region, which includes the municipalities located to the southeast, south and southwest of Lake Maracaibo, live communities of animals that are largely the same as those living in the dry region, especially the birds. At As for mammals, there are new species, such as the spider monkey, also known as the marimonda (Ateles belzebuth hybridus), a species that lives in the humid forests of the Maracaibo Lake Basin (includes the forests of the Perijá mountain range).

In the Perijá sub-region (mountainous area), the ecosystem is made up of a great diversity of animal communities: mammals, birds, reptiles, amphibians and fish. Representatives of some species of mammals in this subregion are: the spectacled bear (Tremarctos ornatus), which is in a category of threat (critical danger) due to the pressure exerted by the hunt, which has caused the decrease of the populations of these animals, in spite of being distributed in areas protected by the Venezuelan laws.

Government and politics

State Constitution 
Since the creation of the Sovereign State of Zulia on February 17, 1864, with the approval of the first State Constitution, it regulates the structure and function of the government of Zulia. Like all Venezuelan State Constitutions, it is subject to national judicial review. Any of the provisions of the Constitution may be annulled if they conflict with national law and the Constitution of the Bolivarian Republic of Venezuela. The Constitution of the State of Zulia was promulgated on August 13, 2003, and partially amended in 2011, currently in force, thus repealing the Constitution of 1989, its partial amendment of 1993 and 2001.

Executive Power 
The Executive Power is represented by the Governor of Zulia State. The Governor is elected by means of direct and secret universal suffrage of all Venezuelan citizens residing in the territory of Zulia State and registered in the Electoral Roll of the State's circumscription. To occupy the position of Governor, it is necessary to be a Venezuelan citizen by birth and without any other nationality in full enjoyment of civil rights and older, to reside in the Federal Entity at least four years before the election according to Article 69 of the State Constitution, to be older than 25 years, not to be a minister of religious worship or to occupy positions in the national, state or municipal administration, and in case of being an official, to be separated from the position. The term of office of the state governor is four years. A governor may be re-elected an undetermined number of times.

In addition, according to the State Constitution, the Governor is accompanied in his governmental action by a Council of Secretaries starting with the General Secretariat of Government, the Secretariat of Education, the Secretariat of Infrastructure; the Secretariat of Administration, the Secretariat of Defense and Citizen Security, the Secretariat of Culture, the Secretariat of Promotion of Higher Education, the Secretariat of Health and the Secretariat of Environment, Lands and Territorial Ordering among others.

Legislative Power 
The regional Parliament is represented by the Legislative Council of Zulia State, a unicameral body. It has the power to discuss and sanction the State Constitution, the laws of state competence, to reform the existing ones or to repeal those considered obsolete, in addition to approving the regional budget and supervising the action of the government. The Zulian Legislative Council is made up of 15 members called "Legislators". In the last election the State was formed by 11 electoral districts. The voters of each circumscription choose the number of legislators according to the number of population living in the Municipalities according to the official census of the INE. The mandate of the legislators is for four year renewable periods, being elected by the people in accordance with the Constitution of the State and the Republic.

Security 
Security and public order in the State is in charge of the Regional Police of the State of Zulia, officially known as the Corps of Police of the State of Zulia, which depends on the State Government. At the local level, most municipalities have their own police forces as a result of decentralization and based on the provisions of Article 164 of the Constitution of Venezuela of 1999 and Article 25 of the Constitution of the State of Zulia of 2003.

Like the other 23 federal entities of Venezuela, the State maintains its own police force, which is supported and complemented by the National Police and the Venezuelan National Guard.

Municipalities and municipal seats
The state of Zulia occupies an area of 63,100 km2, which represents a 5.50% of the national total. This area is distributed among continental, insular, lacustrine and maritime spaces. The continental space is distributed in 21 municipalities (municipios), being those of greater territorial extension with respect to the state: Machiques de Perijá (18.90%), Jesus Maria Semprum (11.95%), Catatumbo (10.40%), Rosario de Perijá (7.79%) and Colón (6.71%), which occupy more than 50% of the total state area.

Economy 

The region has great economic resources among which are the livestock, oil, mining, agricultural and cheese production. Its economy basically depends on oil and natural gas. Oil activity has been carried out intensively since 1912, both on the mainland and in Lake Maracaibo, generating an income that exceeds the regional domain, since it is the main support of the national economy. It covers a great part of the national production of oil and hydrocarbons. Additionally, the coal mines of El Guasare are the most important in the country.

The high potential of the soils in the south of Lake Maracaibo, allow a significant agricultural and livestock development. It is the first producer of various agricultural and livestock items: oil palm, grapes, milk, cheese, cattle, sheep and poultry; the second in eggs and the third in cambur, bananas and goats. Also cultivated: sugar cane, coconut, yucca, cotton, beans, melon and sorghum. Forest production is also significant. 

The maritime resources make it the second largest supplier of fish in the country. In the lake it is fished: bass, horse mackerel, mackerel, blue crab, small mouth, morning and sea bass, and in the Gulf of Venezuela: dogfish, horse mackerel, grouper and snapper. The shrimp was abundant in times before the 70's, when the saturation of fishing boats began, leading to its decrease.

Demographics 
There is great ethnic and racial diversity in Zuila. The migration of Venezuelans from other regions and immigrants from neighboring countries in combination with indigenous communities present in Zuila has created its enormous and unique cultural richness.

Race and ethnicity 
The demonym for the people of the Zulia region is Zulians.

According to the 2011 Census, the racial composition of the population was as follows:

Sports 
The state is home to the Gaiteros del Zulia, 4-time Champion of the Liga Profesional de Baloncesto, Venezuela's top professional basketball league. The team plays its home games at the Gimnasio Pedro Elías Belisario Aponte in Maracaibo. In baseball the state has the Aguilas del Zulia team which is affiliated to the Venezuelan Professional Baseball League and is based in the Luis Aparicio El Grande Stadium in Maracaibo. Since 2011 they have been holding exhibition games at the Victor Davalillo Stadium in Cabimas.

Among the football teams we find Zulia Fútbol Club that plays in the José Encarnación Romero Stadium (First Division of Venezuela), Deportivo JBL del Zulia (Second Division of Venezuela), Titanes Fútbol Club (Second Division of Venezuela) and Zulia Fútbol Club "B" (Third Division of Venezuela).

Transportation

Roads and highways 
The State of Zulia has one of the best road networks in the country, as befits the fact that the west of the country is located in this state.

The main roads are:

The C1, (Highway 1): which starts from the Distributor Las Delicias in the state capital to the western head of the Rafael Urdaneta Bridge.
The Trunk 6, which connects the entire state from Castilletes to the limits of the state of Táchira, passing through Maracaibo and connecting all the western part of the state.
Trunk 17, (Lara-Zulia Highway): which starts from the eastern head of the Rafael Urdaneta Bridge that allows communication with the state of Lara and the center-west of Venezuela.
Trunk 3, (Falcon-Zulia): connects Zulia with the state of Falcon and the central states of Venezuela.
Trunk 1, (Pan-American Highway): Integrates the south of the state of Zulia with Mérida and Trujillo.
Trunk 3, (Intercommunal): that intertwines all the communities located in the Eastern Coast of the Lake of Maracaibo.

Air transportation 
The main airport is La Chinita International, located in the municipality of San Francisco within the great conurbation that constitutes Gran Maracaibo, this stands out as the third most important airport in the country, with boardings of more than one and a half million passengers and allows connections with the main cities of the country such as Caracas, Valencia, Barquisimeto, Maturín, Ciudad Guayana and San Cristóbal, as well as the main tourist destinations in Venezuela such as Porlamar, Mérida and Puerto La Cruz, also have international departures to the Caribbean, North, Central and South America.

Besides the mentioned airport, the state has other air terminals located in 2 political-administrative regions such as Costa Oriental del Lago where the Oro Negro Airport is located in the city of Cabimas and in the South Zone of the Lake where the Miguel Urdaneta Fernández Airport is located in the city of Santa Bárbara del Zulia.

Subway 
The Maracaibo Metro is a mass transportation system that integrates surface, air and subway modes that was inaugurated pre-operatively and free of charge to the public on November 25, 2006, while it began commercial operations three years later, on Tuesday, June 9, 2009. It is currently in the process of expansion.

Aquatic transportation 
Zulia has one of the most important ports in Venezuela, Maracaibo. Historically, the western port has been one of the most important since the colonial era, due to its location and natural characteristics. The state has 83 ports of dockage emphasizing the oil terminal of La Salina and the petrochemical terminal of El Tablazo.

Media 

The most important newspapers produced in the region are La Verdad and Panorama, both based in Maracaibo and the latter being one of the three main newspapers of national circulation. El Regional del Zulia based in Ciudad Ojeda is also among the most read in the state.

Zulia state also has three local open signal television stations such as NCTV (Niños Cantores Televisión, Channel 11 VHF), Televiza (Channel 7 VHF), Telecolor (Channel 41 UHF), Global TV (Channel 65 UHF) and Catatumbo Televisión (Channel 31 UHF), and cable stations such as ATEL (Americana de Televisión, as a national broadcast), and Coquivacoa Televisión, all based in Maracaibo.

On the Eastern Coast of the Lake there are Zuliana de Televisión (Channels 28 and 30 UHF), and cable channels such as TV COL (Televisora de la Costa Oriental del Lago) and Ciudad TV. In the western zone of the Perijá region are Ganadera 88.1, Sierra 99.1, Momentos 107.3, Selecta 102.7 www.selectafm.com, Oye 90.9, Fe y Alegría 105.5, Rosario 95.5, Multivision (Cable Operator) and Imagen TV (Cable Channel).

Culture

Religion 
The majority of the population of Zulia state is Christian which is a legacy of centuries of Spanish colonization. The largest church is the Catholic one, being the devotion to the Virgin Mary in her advocation of Our Lady of the Rosary of Chiquinquira an important annual event that is part of the Zulian culture. The state constitution guarantees freedom of worship and there are several Protestant and other religious groups.

Languages 
A vast majority of Zuila's population speaks Spanish, specifically Marabino Spanish. As with other Latin American nations, Spanish spread throughout the region during the centuries of Spanish colonization. However, there are still remnants of the languages spoken by Native American communities. Wayuu is the most widely spoken indigenous language in Venezuela with approximately 119,000 native speakers. Although this language is spoken throughout Zulia, most of its speakers live in the Guajira Peninsula which also encompasses a large territory/department in Colombia.

Other indigenous languages spoken in Zulia include Yukpa (endangered, 7500 speakers), Bari (endangered, 8000 speakers) and Japreria (critically endangered, 95 speakers).

Zuila is the only Venezuelan state where the use of voseo is widespread. Spanish and indigenous languages have been recognized as official languages by this state's government. However, Spanish is used more often than the others by government, education, and business entities as well as the media.

Regional symbols 

The state of Zulia has symbols that identify it politically, historically and culturally with the Nation and the other Federal Entities. Being the Hymn of Zulia State, elected by the then Legislative Assembly in 1909, the Coat of Arms of Zulia State from 1917, the Flag of Zulia State that dates from 1991 by Executive Decree of the State. They are legally established as such in the State Constitution.

Natural symbols 

The state of Zulia has resources from nature that identify its beauty. These are: The Coconut tree (Cocos nucifera) is the tree that represents the beauty and richness of the Zulian flora, the Cayenne or Chinese Rose (Hibiscus rosa-sinensis) and the brown pelican of the Caribbean (Pelecanus occidentalis).

References

 
States of Venezuela
States and territories established in 1864
1864 establishments in Venezuela